Atholl Gardens is a suburb of Johannesburg, South Africa. It is located in Region E.

Demographics
According to the South African National Census of 2001, 615 people lived in Atholl Gardens. 73.7% were White, 22.0% Black African, 3.9% Indian or Asian and 0.5% Coloured. 71.7% spoke English, 7.5% Afrikaans, 5.9% Zulu, 4.4% Tswana, 2.9% Sotho, 2.0% Venda, 2.0% Xhosa, 0.5% Northern Sotho, 0.5% Swazi, 0.5% Southern Ndebele and 2.4% some other language as their first language.

References

Johannesburg Region E